The Northeastern Correctional Center is a minimum security/pre-release state prison in Massachusetts that opened in 1932.  NCC sits on 300 acres of farmland and provides many inmates with work opportunities prior to being released from prison.  The facility is accredited by the American Correctional Association (ACA), managed by the Massachusetts Department of Correction, and overseen by the Massachusetts Department of Public Safety. On January 6, 2020, there were 188 inmates in general population beds.

Covid cases 
Pursuant to the Supreme Judicial Court's April 3, 2020 Opinion and Order in the Committee for Public Counsel Services v. Chief Justice of the Trial Court, SJC-12926 matter, as amended on April 10, April 28 and June 23, 2020 (the “Order”), the Special Master posts weekly reports which are located on the SJC website here for COVID testing and cases for each of the correctional facilities administered by the Department of Correction and each of the county Sheriffs’ offices. The SJC Special master link above has the most up to date information reported by the correctional agencies and is posted for the public to view.

References 

1932 establishments in Massachusetts
Buildings and structures in Concord, Massachusetts
Prisons in Massachusetts